Paulo César Ramos Vogt (born February 7, 1977) is a Brazilian football (soccer) striker who works for Swiss Breitenrain as an assistant manager. He previously spent his career in Liechtenstein, Ukraine and Cyprus before signing for the Swiss club in 2009.

Paulo Vogt made six Ukrainian Premier League appearances, scoring once, for FC Metalurh Donetsk during 2006.

Honours 
Sion
Swiss Cup: 2005–06

References

External links
Profile at Samba Foot
 

1977 births
Living people
Brazilian footballers
Brazilian expatriate footballers
Mogi Mirim Esporte Clube players
Iraty Sport Club players
FC Schaffhausen players
FC Baden players
FC Winterthur players
FC Vaduz players
FC Luzern players
FC Sion players
FC Metalurh Donetsk players
FC Stal Alchevsk players
APEP FC players
FC Chiasso players
FC Solothurn players
FC Wangen bei Olten players
Swiss Challenge League players
Ukrainian Premier League players
Cypriot First Division players
Expatriate footballers in Cyprus
Expatriate footballers in Ukraine
Brazilian expatriate sportspeople in Ukraine
Expatriate footballers in Liechtenstein
Expatriate footballers in Switzerland
Brazilian people of German descent
Association football forwards
FC Kreuzlingen players